The Elkton Oregon AVA is an American Viticultural Area that was established in 2013 in and around the town of Elkton, Oregon.  The AVA encompasses .  It is 17th AVA in Oregon and resides completely inside the greater Umpqua Valley AVA and huge Southern Oregon AVA, an area known to be warmer than the northern appellations of Oregon. 

Elkton Oregon covers approximately 11 percent of the  Umpqua Valley AVA and .04 percent of the much larger  Southern Oregon AVA.

Topography
Elkton Oregon is the northernmost and lowest elevation region in the Umpqua Valley.

Soils
Predominately residual clay and/or silt loam soil or small to large cobble-dominated alluvial deposits.

Climate
Features a cooler, but milder and longer growing season than the rest of the Umpqua Valley and receives much more rain annually, about 50 inches.

References

American Viticultural Areas
Oregon wine
2013 establishments in Oregon